Pezo is a Congolese and Spanish surname. Notable people with the name include:
 Leodan Pezo (1993), Peruvian boxer
 Toni Pezo (1987), Croatian football midfielder

References 

Kongo-language surnames
Spanish-language surnames